World Keratoconus Day is an observance dedicated to keratoconus. It falls on November 10.

References

Health awareness days
International observances
November observances